rekonq was a lightweight, QtWebKit-based web browser developed inside the free software project KDE. It is the default web browser of Chakra GNU/Linux, and was formerly of Kubuntu (between versions 10.10 and 13.10). rekonq has been officially included in KDE Extragear since 25 May 2010. In contrast to Konqueror, a web browser and file manager also developed by KDE, rekonq aims to be a standalone and simple web browser.
Its code was initially based on Qt Development Frameworks' QtDemoBrowser and is developed on KDE Projects' Git repository.

As of January 2014, there has been no further development of rekonq, and there is no manpower or sponsorship to restart development.

Features 
rekonq integrates into the KDE desktop, e.g. downloading files through KDE download system, sharing bookmarks with Konqueror, KIO support, etc. rekonq possesses most of the features of a modern web browser, specifically:

 Tabbed browsing
 Unique loading address bar
 Ad blocker
 Support for plugins (Flash, Java)
 Proxy support

rekonq uses the WebKit HTML rendering engine provided in QtWebKit.

See also 

 Comparison of lightweight web browsers
 Comparison of web browsers
 List of web browsers
 List of web browsers for Unix and Unix-like operating systems

References 

Applications using D-Bus
Extragear
Free software programmed in C++
Free software projects
Free web browsers
POSIX web browsers
Software based on WebKit
Web browsers that use Qt